Hemipilia is a genus of plants in the family Orchidaceae. It is native to China, the Himalayas and Southeast Asia.

Species 

 Hemipilia calophylla C.S.P.Parish & Rchb.f. - Yunnan, Myanmar, Thailand, Vietnam
 Hemipilia cordifolia Lindl. - Sichuan, Taiwan, Tibet, Yunnan, Bhutan, India, Myanmar, Nepal, Assam
 Hemipilia crassicalcarata S.S.Chien - Shaanxi, Shanxi, Sichuan
 Hemipilia cruciata = H. cordifolia
 Hemipilia discolor Aver. & Averyanova - Vietnam
 Hemipilia flabellata Bureau & Franch. - Guizhou, Sichuan, Yunnan
 Hemipilia forrestii Rolfe - Tibet, Sichuan, Yunnan
 Hemipilia henryi Rolfe - Sichuan, Hubei
 Hemipilia kwangsiensis Tang & F.T.Wang ex K.Y.Lang - Yunnan, Guangxi
 Hemipilia limprichtii Schltr. - Yunnan, Guizhou
 Hemipilia × mixta Ormerod - Sichuan   (H. cordifolia × H. flabellata)
 Hemipilia purpureopunctata (K.Y.Lang) X.H.Jin, Schuit. & W.T.Jin – south-east Tibet to Arunachal Pradesh
 Hemipilia yunnanensis Schltr. - Yunnan

References

External links 

 
Orchideae genera
Orchids of Asia
Taxonomy articles created by Polbot